The outfield is a portion of the field of play in certain sports.

Outfield may also refer to:

 The Outfield, an English rock band
 The Outfield (film), a 2015 American sports film
 "The Outfield", a song by Good Charlotte from Youth Authority

See also 
 Outfielder